A partial lunar eclipse will take place on Wednesday, 18 September 2024, the second of two lunar eclipses in 2024 and the final partial lunar eclipse of Lunar Saros 118.

Visibility
It will be completely visible over western parts of Africa and Europe, South and eastern North America, will be seen rising over the rest of North America, and setting over the rest of Africa and Europe.

Related eclipses

Eclipses of 2024 
 A penumbral lunar eclipse on 25 March.
 A total solar eclipse on 8 April.
 A partial lunar eclipse on 18 September.
 An annular solar eclipse on 2 October.

Lunar year series

Saros series
It is part of Saros cycle 118.

Half-Saros cycle
A lunar eclipse will be preceded and followed by solar eclipses by 9 years and 5.5 days (a half saros). This lunar eclipse is related to two partial solar eclipses of Solar Saros 125.

See also
List of lunar eclipses and List of 21st-century lunar eclipses

References

External links
Saros cycle 118

2024-09
2024-09
2024 in science